Cyril Blažo (born 1970 in Bratislava) is a Slovak artist who lives and works in Bratislava in Slovakia.

He has been teaching at the University of Trnava since 1999 and currently teaches drawing, graphics, writing and graphic design, focusing on the basics of these artistic media and building the technical, technological and creative foundations of student work. In 2002, he won the award of the city of Banska Bystrica on the Trian of Contemporary Slovak Graphics. His works are presented in the collections of the Slovak National Gallery in Bratislava and the Central Slovak Gallery in Banska Bystrica.

Education
Blažo was educated in Bratislava, attending supš from 1984 to 1988, and the Academy of Fine Arts and Design (VŠVU) from 1988 to 1994.

Exhibitions
Blažo has had many solo exhibitions domestically and internationally:

Group exhibitions 
In addition to his solo exhibition, Blažo has been exhibited in a number of group exhibitions:

References

External links
 amt _ project, Bratislava
 Kunstverein  München
 Tranzit.sk
 Title unknown
 Trnava City Museum

Slovak contemporary artists
Slovak artists
1970 births
Living people